Danie Theunissen (12 July 1869 – 19 Mar 1964) was a South African international rugby union player who played as a forward.

He made 1 appearance for South Africa against the British Lions in 1896.

References

South African rugby union players
South Africa international rugby union players
1869 births
1964 deaths
Rugby union forwards
Griquas (rugby union) players